Al-Merrikh Sporting Club is a Sudanese professional football club based in Omdurman. Their home stadium is Al-Merrikh Stadium, which is locally known as The Red Castle. Founded in 1908, Al-Merrikh is one of the oldest football clubs in Africa, and have won the Sudan Premier League 22 times and Sudan Cup 26 times. The club share a fierce rivalry with Al-Hilal, the games between them regularly selling out, as well as being the only other realistic challenger to the league crown. They won the Om-al-Dahab championship in 1965 and have been the only team to have ever won this one time event.
Al-Hilal are also based in Omdurman with only Al-Ardha street separating the teams and between them they are Sudan's most powerful and successful football clubs.

Club history
Al-Merrikh was founded under the name of Al-Masalma Sporting Club in 1908 by students from Al-Masalmah district that was headed by their chairman Jek Deng Aban Gorang in Omdurman of Gordon Memorial College. The club renamed as Al-Merrikh Sporting Club on 14 November 1927.

See also
In 2015 Al-Merreikh signed South Sudanese player Aluck Akech from Malakia after Aluck played with South Sudan against Mauritania for 2018 World Cup qualifications.

Crest

Honours

National titles

Sudan Premier League
Champion (19): 1970, 1972, 1974, 1978, 1982, 1985, 1990, 1993, 1997, 2000, 2001, 2002, 2008, 2011, 2013, 2015, 2018, 2018–19, 2019-20.

Sudan Cup
Winners (15): 1991, 1993, 1994, 1996, 2001, 2005, 2006, 2007, 2008, 2010, 2012, 2013, 2014, 2015, 2018. (Record)

African titles
 
African Cup Winners' Cup
Winners (1): 1989

CAF Confederation Cup
Runner-up (1): 2007

Cecafa titles

CECAFA Clubs Cup
Winners (3): 1986, 1994, 2014

Performance in CAF competitions

CAF Champions League: 27 appearances

CAF Champions League

Top scorers in CAF Champions League

 CAF Confederation Cup: 8 appearances

2004 – Preliminary round 
2005 – Second Round 
2006 – Play-off 
2007 – Finalist 
2008 – Group stage (Top 8)
2010 – Play-off 
2012 – Semi-finals 
2016 – Play-off 

Top scorers in CAF Confederation Cup

 African Cup Winners' Cup: 11 appearances1984 – Second Round
1985 – First Round
1987 – First Round
1989 – Winner1990 – Semi-finals
1992 – Semi-finals
1993 – Quarter-Finals
1995 – Second Round
1997 – First Round
1999 – First Round
2000 – Second Round

Top scorers in African Cup Winners' Cup

Performance in UAFA competitionsArab Club Champions Cup: 12 appearances1988 – Group stage
1994 – Group stage
1998 – Withdrew
2002 – Preliminary Round
2003–04 – First Round
2005–06 – First Round
2006–07 – First Round
2007–08 – Second Round
2008–09 – Second Round
2016–17 – Group stage
2018–19 – Semi-finals
2019-20 – First round
Top scorers in Arab Club Champions CupArab Cup Winners' Cup: 2 appearances1992 – Group stage
1997 – Preliminary Round
Top scorers in Arab Cup Winners' Cup

Performance in CECAFA competitionsCECAFA Clubs Cup: 8 appearances1985 –Third place
1986 –Champion1987 –Runners-up
1988 –Runners-up
1994 –Champion2009 –Runners-up
2011 –Third place
2014 –ChampionTop scorers in Kagame Interclub Cup

Players

Out on loan

 (on loan) Hilal Alsahil SC (Until June 2023)
 (on loan) Hilal Alsahil SC (Until June 2023)
 (on loan) Hay Al-Arab SC (Until June 2023)
 (on loan) Al-Ahli SC (Wad Madani) (Until June 2023)

Captaincy history
 Abdel Wahab Jagdoul 
 Suliman Abdel Gader (1973-1981)
 Ammar Khaled (1982-1986)
 Sami Ezzeldin (1987-1990)
 Hamed Berima (1991-1996)
 Babeker Alhelo (1997)
 Khaled Almustafa (1997-2002)
 Ebrahim Al Hussein (2003)
 Muhamed Musa (2004)
 Faroug Jabra (2005)
 Faisal Agab (2006-2013)
 Saeed Mustafa (2014)
 Ahmed El-Basha (2014-2015)
 Raji Abdel-Aati (2016-2017)
 Amir Kamal (2018-)

Managerial history
Updated: January 2018.

 Mansour Ramadan
 John Manning
 Senad Kreso
 Ion Motroc
  Saleh El Ghayaty (1967–74)
 Jafar Dirar (1985)
 Ernst Röder (1989)
 Hassan Shehata (1989–90)
 Horst Köppel (1991)
 Hassan Al Masri (1991)
 Horst Köppel (1994)
 Hassan Al Masri (1996)
 Salah Mushkila (1996)
 Mohamed Mazda (1996)
 Mészáros (1997)
 Jafar Dirar (1998)
 Salah Mushkila (1998)
 Mohamed Mazda (1999)
 Jafar Dirar (1999–00)
 Sadiq Al Omda (2001)
 Marco Cunha (2002)
 Ahmed Rifaat (2002–03)
 Carlos Roberto Pereira (2003–04)
 Werner (2004)
 Mahmoud Saad (2004–05)
 Branco Tucak (2005)
 Mahmoud Saad (2005–06)
 Mohammed Omar (2006)
 Gamal Abuanjah (2006) (CT) Otto Pfister (2006–07)
 Mohamed Mazda (2007–08)
 Michael Krüger (2008–09)
 Salah Mushkila (2009) (CT) Rodion Gačanin (2009)
 Mohamed Mazda (2009) (CT) José Luis Carbone (2009–10)
 Gamal Abuanjah (2010) (CT) Michael Krüger (Jul 2010 – Nov 2010)
 Hossam El-Badry (Dec 2010 – Dec 2011)
 Farouk Jabra (Dec 2011 – Mar 2012)
 Heron Ricardo Ferreira (Mar 2012 – Dec 2012)
 Mohamed Nabil Khoukhi (Dec 2012 – Aug 2013)
 Michael Krüger (Aug 2013 – Feb 2014)
 Otto Pfister (Feb 2014 – Dec 2014)
 Diego Garzitto (Dec 2014 – Nov 2015)
 Luc Eymael (Dec 2015 – Jun 2016)
 Antoine Hey (Nov 2016 – Jan 2017)
 Diego Garzitto (Jan 2017 – Aug 2017)
 A Mohammed Saad (Aug 2017 – Jan 2018) (CT) Mohamed Mazda (Jan 2018 – Jan 2019)
 Yamen Zelfani (Jan 2019 – Jul 2019)
 Jamel Khcharem (Jul 2019 – Nov 2020)
 Didier Gomes Da Rosa (Nov 2020 – Jan 2021)
 Nasreddine Nabi (Feb 2021 – Mar 2021)
 Lee Clark (Mar 2021 – Jun 2021)
 Ibrahim 'Ibrahoma' Hussein (Jun 2021 – Dec 2021) (CT) Leonardo Neiva (Dec 2021 – Jan 2022)
 Lee Clark (Jan 2022 –)

Note: (CT)''' caretaker

Presidential history
Al-Merrikh have had numerous presidents over the course of history, none of them was owner of the club, although the land on which the current stadium was owned by Abdularahman Shakhour, some of the presidents have been honorary players. Currently Gamal Alwali is the chairman. Here is a complete list of Al-Merrikh club presidents from 1927 until the present day.

Khaled Abdullah
Sulaiman Atabani
Mohammed Khair Ali
Mohammed Ali Bakhiet
Yousif Omer Agha
Mohammed Bashier Fourawy
Mohammed Sherrief Ahmed
Ishag Shadad
Dr. Mohammed Saeed Bayiomy
Bashier Hassan Bashier
Ibrahim Mohammed Ahmed
Fahmy Sulaiman
Yousif Abusamra
Abdulrahim Osman Saleh
Dr. Mohammed Alfatih
Badawy Mohammed Osman
Awad Abuzeid
Abdulrahman Shakhour
Mahadi Alfaki
Hassan Abu-ala'ila
Fouad Altoum
Abdulaziz Shiddou
Khalid Hassan Abbas
Abdulhamid Haggoug
Mahil Abu Ginna
Dr. Tag Alsir Mahgoub
Mohammed Eliyas mahgoub
Dr. Gamal Alwali

References

External links
  

 
Merrikh
Association football clubs established in 1908
Omdurman
1908 establishments in Sudan
M